Oscar Sydney Cox (December 3, 1905 – October 4, 1966) was an American lawyer and judge.

Cox attended Massachusetts Institute of Technology and earned two degrees from Yale University Bachelor of Philosophy (1927) and a Bachelor of Laws (1929). He was associated with the well-known law firm Cadwalader, Wickersham & Taft in New York City. From 1934–1938, Cox served as Assistant Corporation Counsel for taxes. In 1938, he left New York City for a post with the United States Department of the Treasury. In 1941, Cox was appointed General Counsel of the Lend-Lease Administration and the Office for Emergency Management (1941-1943).

Cox was born on December 3, 1905 in Portland, Maine from a Jewish family. His son, Warren J. Cox (born 1935) is a well-known architect. Oscar Cox died on October 4, 1966 in Washington, D. C.

References

1905 births
1966 deaths
Lawyers from Portland, Maine
New York (state) lawyers
Massachusetts Institute of Technology alumni
Jewish American attorneys
Franklin D. Roosevelt administration personnel
Yale Law School alumni
People associated with Cadwalader, Wickersham & Taft
Jews and Judaism in Portland, Maine